Espinhosela is a civil parish in the municipality of Bragança, Portugal. The population in 2011 was 244, in an area of 37.03 km².

References

Parishes of Bragança, Portugal